Danby Lake (also known as Danby Dry Lake) is a dry lake bed in the Mojave Desert of San Bernardino County, California,  northwest of Blythe.

See also
 List of lakes in California

References

External links
 Satellite Photo (Google Maps)

Endorheic lakes of California
Lakes of the Mojave Desert
Lakes of San Bernardino County, California
Lakes of California
Lakes of Southern California